Melchior Base ( or, seldom, Estación Melchior) is an Argentine Antarctic base and scientific research station. It is located on Gamma Island (which the Argentines call Isla Observatorio), Melchior Islands, Dallmann Bay, in Palmer Archipelago on Bellingshausen Sea, Antarctic Peninsula.

It is Argentina's second historical Antarctic base, after the 1904 establishment of the Orcadas Naval Detachment, the world's first—and oldest—permanent settlement in Antarctica.

 Melchior is one of 13 research bases in Antarctica operated by Argentina. 
From 1947 to 1961 it served as a permanent base; since then it is open during the summer season only.

History

In January 1942 the Argentine Navy transport ARA Primero de Mayo, commanded by then Frigate Captain Alberto J. Oddera, departed from Buenos Aires with the mission of studying the western coast of the Antarctic Peninsula, especially the area of the Melchior and Argentine Islands. In the former the expedition built a lighthouse and daybeacon.

The archipelago was visited again the following year to continue with the cartographic work and to do maintenance duties on the lighthouse. Three years later, in 1946, the National Antarctic Commission sponsored a new exploration trip.

This new expedition sailed away from the continent in January 1947, led by then Frigate Captain Luis M. García. It was made up of the light transports Patagonia and Chaco, the patrol ships ARA King and ARA Murature, the tanker Ministro Ezcurra and the whaler Don Samuel. 
The expedition arrived in Observatorio Island on the last day of 1947, and set up a hydrographic camp and basic astronomical observatory at Punta Gallows.

It had a water boiler, two power generators, batteries and several radio transmitters.

The crew unloaded  of equipment and supplies, including  of coal, a difficult operation due to the high waves and lack of landing beaches. On 31 March 1947 the construction was finished. Patagonia was forced to leave the area as ice began to cover the seas. A brief farewell ceremony was held at the foot of the mast, where Captain García handed command of the new facilities over to Lieutenant Juan A. Nadaud.

In 1952 Melchior became the main source for Antarctic weather forecasts, broadcasting reports three times per day. Larger astronomic facilities were inaugurated in 1955; later, during the 1957–58 International Geophysical Year, the first automatic tide gauge in Antarctica was installed at the base.

On 30 November 1961 Melchior was demoted to summer-only base.

In the austral summer campaign of 1962–63 four Bernardino Rivadavia Natural Sciences Museum scientists conducted marine biology research. Since the summer season of 1968–69 the facilities have been periodically used for this scientific discipline, under commission of the Argentine Naval Hydrographic Service.

Description

 the base is composed of 4 buildings which can house a maximum crew of 15.
It has a basic infirmary of  attended by a paramedic.

Climate

See also
 Argentine Antarctica
 List of Antarctic research stations
 List of Antarctic field camps
 List of lighthouses in Antarctica

References

External links
 Fundaciòn Marambio – Base Melchior 
 Dirección Nacional del Antártico 

Melchior
Populated places established in 1947
Lighthouses in Antarctica
1947 establishments in Antarctica